First Contact is a Canadian documentary television series, which premiered on APTN in 2018. Based on the Australian series First Contact, the show profiles six Canadians who are challenged over a period of 28 days about their pre-existing perceptions of First Nations peoples by experiencing indigenous Canadian life firsthand.

The series was narrated by George Stroumboulopoulos.

The series received Canadian Screen Award nominations for Best Factual Program or Series at the 7th Canadian Screen Awards in 2019 and at the 8th Canadian Screen Awards in 2020.

References

2018 Canadian television series debuts
2010s Canadian documentary television series
Aboriginal Peoples Television Network original programming
First Nations television series